Karlin or Karalin is a village outside Pinsk, Belarus. It was founded as an independent town in 1690 and was named after the village's founder, Jan Karol Dolski. By 1695, Dolski had built a church (now a concert hall) and a fortified manor on the spot. He also allowed Jews to settle in the area, where it became the seat of a Hasidic dynasty.

Overview
The Wiśniowiecki family took control of the village and extended the castle. In 1706, however, the village was captured by the Swedish forces and burnt. Following the destruction of Pinsk, many locals moved to the partially restored village, which with time became a notable suburb. In 1786, a new church of the Bernardines was built there (currently an Orthodox church devoted to St. Barbara). In the second partition of Poland in 1793, Karlin was part of the region ceded to Russia. In 1799, the Russian authorities incorporated Karlin into Pinsk.

Notable people from Karlin
Aaron ben Jacob of Karlin
Aaron ben Asher of Karlin

See also
 Karlin-Stolin (Hasidic dynasty)

References

External links
 "Karlin", The 1901 Jewish Encyclopedia.

Pinsk
Shtetls